Sula Sgeir is a small, uninhabited Scottish island in the North Atlantic,  west of Rona. It has a narrow elongated shape running north-northeast to south-southwest, and is approximately 900 m long by typically 100 m wide (apart from a central headland projecting a further 100 m on the easterly side).

A ruined stone bothy called Taigh Beannaichte (Blessed House) can be found on the east headland Sgeir an Teampaill. A small automated lighthouse on the south end at Sròn na Lice is regularly damaged by the huge waves which break over the island during rough North Atlantic storms. Despite this, the island has diverse flora.

Etymology

The modern name is from the Old Norse súla, "gannet" and sker, "skerry". In the 16th century Dean Munro referred to the island as "Suilskeray". Macculloch's 1819 Description refers to "Sulisker", an Anglicised spelling that is still occasionally used. There is Suleskjer, a skerry in Utsira, Norway which has a name with a similar origin; there is also a Sule Skerry in Orkney.

Geology
The island is made of hard gneiss rock, the summit of a submarine mountain. Erosion causes the bedrock to sheer into long flat pieces. The sea has created a series of interconnected sea caves and tunnels throughout the southern part of the island. During big Atlantic storms, waves break right over the top of Sula Sgeir.

History

Brenhilda, the sister of the 7th Century CE cleric, St Ronan of Iona, is supposed to have gone to live on Sula Sgeir  where she was found dead in a bothy with a cormorant's nest in her ribcage.

Sula Sgeir has a special place in the seafaring history of the men of the Ness district on Lewis. Dean Munro visited the Hebrides in 1549 and his is one of the earliest accounts written about the Western Isles. His description of Sula Sgeir mentions that the men of Ness sailed in their small craft to "fetche hame thair boatful of dry wild fowls with wild fowl fedderi". How long before 1549 the Nessmen sailed to Sula Sgeir each year to collect the young gannets for food and feathers is not known, but it may be assumed that it was a tradition for centuries. That tradition is still carried on today. A 1797 census report written by the Reverend Donald McDonald states:

"There is in Ness a most venturous set of people who for a few years back, at the hazard of their lives, went there in an open six-oared boat without even the aid of a compass."

The flesh of the young gannet or guga is regarded as a delicacy in Ness today though, for others, it is an acquired taste. It was a popular meat in earlier times in Scotland. In the sixteenth century it was served at the tables of Scots kings and was a favourite with the wealthy as a ’whet’ or appetizer before main meals. In the autumn of each year, a group of 10 Nessmen set sail for Sula Sgeir to kill a maximum of 2,000 young birds. They set up residence for about two weeks in stone bothys. Working in pairs, the men take the fledglings from their nests with poles, catching them around the neck with a rope noose, then killing the birds with a blow to the head. They bring home their catch to meet an eager crowd of customers. The demand is often so great that the birds have to be rationed out to ensure that each person does not go without a taste of guga. In 2009, a single guga fetched £16. 1953 saw the last journey under sail for the guga hunt, thereafter a fishing trawler was used, although it was still a five-hour trip.

The Sula Sgeir hunt, which would otherwise be illegal under the Wildlife and Countryside Act 1981, receives an annual licence from the government, which allows it to continue. Scottish Natural Heritage, which is now responsible for granting the licence, states that the hunt is sustainable, although it has been criticised by animal welfare groups. The Scottish SPCA describes it as "barbaric and inhumane" and believes it causes unnecessary suffering to the birds, with many taking several blows to be killed.

Sula Sgeir, with North Rona, historically formed part of the Barvas estate on Lewis, but a community buy-out of the estate from the Duckworth family in 2016 did not include the two islands, which would apparently have increased the purchase price by £80,000.

Fauna
There are some 5,000 breeding pairs of gannets on Sula Sgeir, which they share with other bird species such as black-legged kittiwakes, common guillemots, puffins, northern fulmars and in the summers of 2005 to 2007 a Black-browed Albatross was resident in the gannet colony.

Together with North Rona, Sula Sgeir was formerly a national nature reserve because of its importance for birdlife and grey seal breeding.  It remains a protected area for nature and is a Site of Special Scientific Interest and a Special Protection Area.

Media and the arts

 In 2009 Director Mike Day sailed with the guga hunters to Sula Sgeir and filmed on the island over a 10-day period. The resulting film was commissioned by BBC Scotland and broadcast in January 2010.
 Scottish writer Peter May uses the setting of Sula Sgeir describing the annual expedition in his crime story "The Blackhouse" in 2011 (first published in a French translation in 2009).
 Robert Macfarlane describes the hunt at Sula Sgeir in his book The Old Ways: A Journey On Foot. He does not participate in the hunt, but circumnavigates the rock in a small craft at the same time as the arrival of the hunters.<ref>{{cite book|quote=[W]e saw the guga men standing on the steep rock that slopes to the landing point. [...] They looked out at us, unsmiling. [...] They knew the boat, and they knew Ian [Macfarlane's captain], but the implication was clear enough: Keep away, this is our day, our rock.|first=Robert|last=Macfarlane|title=The Old Ways: A Journey on Foot|publisher= Hamish Hamilton|year= 2012|page= 136}}</ref>
 In 2018, BBC Alba aired Sulasgeir: An t-Sealg/The Hunt'', a Gaelic-language documentary about the traditional annual guga hunt held on Sulasgeir by members of the community of Ness on Lewis.

See also
 North Rona
 List of outlying islands of Scotland
 List of lighthouses in Scotland
 List of Northern Lighthouse Board lighthouses
 List of Important Bird Areas in the United Kingdom

Notes

References
 
 Macculloch, John (1819) A Description of the Western Islands of Scotland, Including the Isle of Man. Constable.
 Macculloch, John (1824) The highlands and western isles of Scotland, in letters to Sir Walter Scott. Longman.

Further reading

External links

 News article on 1912 journey (via Archive.org)
 Charles Tait Photographs of Sula Sgeir
 Guga Hunters 

Seabird colonies
Important Bird Areas of Scotland
Protected areas of the Outer Hebrides
Skerries of Scotland
Uninhabited islands of the Outer Hebrides